Acorimus problematicus is a species of beetle in the family Silvanidae, the only species in the genus Acorimus.

References

Silvanidae genera
Monotypic Cucujoidea genera